The 2013–14 season was St Johnstone's fifth-consecutive season in the top flight of Scottish football and their first in the newly established Scottish Premiership, having been promoted from the Scottish First Division at the end of the 2008–09 season. St Johnstone competed in the Europa League, losing to FC Minsk in the Third qualifying round. They also reached the semi-finals of the League Cup, losing to Aberdeen and won the Scottish Cup for the first time in their history.

It was Tommy Wright's first season as manager.

Results

Pre season

Scottish Premiership

UEFA Europa League

Scottish League Cup

Scottish Cup

Player statistics

Squad
Last updated 17 May 2014

 

|}

Disciplinary record
Includes all competitive matches.
Last updated 17 May 2014

Team statistics

League table

Division summary

Transfers

Players in

Players out

References 

2013andndash;14
St Johnstone
St Johnstone